Robert Eyton was an Anglican priest  during the 18th Century.

Eyton was educated at St John's College, Cambridge and ordained in 1705. He was the Rector at Wem and a Prebendary of Hereford Cathedral before being appointed Archdeacon of Ely in 1742. He died  in post on 18 October 1751.

References

1751 deaths
Alumni of St John's College, Cambridge
Archdeacons of Ely